Sanan Gurbanov (born 4 August 1980) is a retired Azerbaijani footballer and current manager of Keşla FK.

Career

Club
He was born in Georgia on 4 August 1980. Moving to Baku with his family in his 1st year, Sanan began to his football life in the city of winds. He got into the professional football by Azerbaijan”s Garabagh, Shafa, Baku, MKT-Araz, Shahdagh, Gabala, ABN-Barda, MOIK and Mughan, as well as Saypa of Iran.  Being capitalized with his possession of air shots, heads and high sense of scoring, the striker was subjected to leave soccer before his real time, but he is still sick to the job he loves. Having the B class of UEFA,  has been working as a coach for 3 years and joined Gabala”s A team as an assistant coach since 2012. But his time with Gabala goes a bit more back to when he started as a trainer for lower age groups of the Gabala Football Academy. Before joining Gabala, Sanan worked for Neftchi ISM that were playing in the First Division.

Managerial
Having previously manager Gabala FK in an Interim position in December 2014, following the sacking of Dorinel Munteanu, Gabala appointed Gurbanov on a two-year contract on 30 On 30 May 2018 after Roman Hryhorchuk had left Gabala the previous day.
On 31 August 2019, Gurbanov resigned as manager following Gabala's 4-0 defeat at home to Keşla.

25 January 2021, Gurbanov was appointed as manager of Keşla.

References

1980 births
Living people
Azerbaijani footballers
Azerbaijani football managers
Azerbaijani expatriate footballers
Qarabağ FK players
FC Baku players
Saipa F.C. players
Gabala FC players
AZAL PFK players
MOIK Baku players
FK Mughan players
Expatriate footballers in Iran
FK MKT Araz players
Gabala FC managers
Shamakhi FK managers

Association football forwards